This list of presidents of the University of Central Oklahoma includes all twenty-one of the people who have served as the president of the University of Central Oklahoma since the institution was founded in 1890.

The University of Central Oklahoma is a public university, created and supported by the State of Oklahoma, and it is a designated "Regional University" within the Regional University System of Oklahoma.  The campus of the university is located in Edmond, and it has facilities in Oklahoma City.

The most recent president of the University of Central Oklahoma was Don Betz until his retirement in June, 2019. Betz replaced W. Roger Webb on July 1, 2012.  Using the university's counting method (acting or "interim" presidents are not numbered), Betz is the twentieth president of the university.  Nineteen men have previously served as the university's permanent president, and two have served as its interim, or acting, president pending the appointment of a new permanent president.

References

Central Oklahoma
University of Central Oklahoma
University of Central Oklahoma-related lists